Takewaka is a Japanese surname. Notable people with the surname include:

Takuma Takewaka (born 1971), Japanese voice actor
Tokiichiro Takewaka (1901–?), Governor of Hiroshima Prefecture

See also
Takekawa (disambiguation)

Japanese-language surnames